Raninagar Jalpaiguri Junction (Code: RQJ) is a railway station and railway junction in Raninagar, Jalpaiguri district, West Bengal, India which serves the Indian city of Jalpaiguri.

It lies in the New Jalpaiguri–New Bongaigaon section under Katihar division of the Northeast Frontier Railway zone.

Branch line to Haldibari begins from here.

See also
 Teesta Torsha Express

Katihar railway division
Railway stations in Jalpaiguri district
Railway stations opened in 1932
Transport in Jalpaiguri
Railway junction stations in West Bengal